Sivignon is a commune in the Saône-et-Loire department in the region of Bourgogne-Franche-Comté in eastern France.

Sivignon is located beneath La Butte de Suin. It has a village called Le Martrat.

See also
Communes of the Saône-et-Loire department

References

Communes of Saône-et-Loire